Sean Reed (born 28 June 1965) is an English–born Australian former professional darts player.

Career
Reed started playing darts at the age of 29. At the time, he was living in Japan, where he was working as an English language teacher. During his time in Japan, he won more than 60 state and national titles including four Grand Master Titles in '98, '99, '02, '03.

In 2004, Reed started playing soft-tip darts. He had moderate success picking up 16 titles over a three-year period. In 2007, he set an unofficial world record of more than 28,000 points scored in just one hour retrieving his own darts and operating the setting of the darts machine.

Reed qualified for the 2012 PDC World Darts Championship as the winner of the Australian Grand Prix series. In the first round, he played against Justin Pipe. Despite winning the first set, Reed lost the match 1–3.

In 2014, Reed became a co-founder and CEO of the International Target Darting Organization (I.T.D.O.).

World Championship results

PDC
 2012: 1st round: (lost to Justin Pipe 1–3) (sets)

References

External links

Living people
Australian darts players
Sportspeople from Sydney
English emigrants to Australia
1965 births
Professional Darts Corporation associate players
Sportsmen from New South Wales